Charles Schomberg may refer to:

 Charles Frederick Schomberg (1815–1874), admiral in the British Royal Navy
 Charles Marsh Schomberg (1779–1835), naval officer and colonial governor
 Charles Schomberg, 2nd Duke of Schomberg (1645–1693), general in the Prussian, Dutch and British Army
 Charles Schomberg, Marquess of Harwich (1683–1713), British soldier
 Charles de Schomberg (1601–1656), Duke of Halluin and Marshal of France